Camilla Herrem (born 8 October 1986) is a Norwegian handball player for Sola HK and the Norwegian national team.

Her international achievements include one Olympic gold medal, three World Championship gold medals, and five gold medals at the European Championship. She became the most successful player in World Championships history with three gold, one silver and one bronze medal by winning the 2021 World Championship.

Career
Camilla Herrem started to play handball at Sola HK, and made her debut in the Norwegian Championship at the age of 16. She first played at international level in the Cup Winners' Cup in 2005.

She moved to the Norwegian Championship silver medalist Byåsen in 2006, wherein she was able to participate each year in the Champions League qualifications. She joined the Romanian champion HCM Baia Mare in the 2014–2015 season, where she reached the Champions League quarterfinals. She moved to the Danish club Team Tvis Holstebro for 1 year, and won the Cup Winners' Cup in 2016. She played in HC Vardar in the 2016–2017 season. The Macedonian team reached the Champions League final, and Camilla was chosen as the best left wing of the Champions League season. At the end of the season, she transferred back to Norway, to her first professional club, Sola HK.

She made her debut for the Norwegian national team against Sweden on 5 April 2006. Camilla has been participating in world tournaments since the 2008 European Championship. She also played in the national team at the 2012 Olympic Games, where they won the gold medal. She was also selected for the All-Star team(s) of the 2009 World Championship, the 2016 European Championship, the 2019 World Championship, and the 2020 European Championship.

Camilla Herrem was selected for the World Handball Team of 2011-2020 Decade's best left winger on handball-planet.com vote.

Achievements
Olympic Games:
Winner: 2012
Bronze Medalist: 2016, 2020
World Championship:
Winner: 2011, 2015, 2021
Silver Medalist: 2017
Bronze Medalist: 2009
European Championship:
Winner: 2008, 2010, 2014, 2016, 2020
Silver Medalist: 2012
EHF Champions League:
Finalist: 2016/2017
EHF Cup Winners' Cup:
Winner: 2015/2016
Finalist: 2006/2007
Semifinalist: 2013/2014
Norwegian League
 Silver Medalist: 2006/2007, 2007/2008, 2009/2010, 2011/2012, 2012/2013, 2013/2014
 Bronze Medalist: 2008/2009, 2010/2011, 2020/2021, 2021/2022
Norwegian Championship First Division (Level 2):
Winner: 2018/2019
Norwegian Cup:
Winner: 2007
Finalist: 2006, 2008, 2009, 2020
Romanian Cup:
Winner: 2014/2015
Romanian Super Cup:
Winner: 2014
Baia Mare Champions Trophy
Winner: 2014
Macedonian Championship:
Winner: 2016/2017
Macedonian Cup:
Winner: 2016/2017

Individual awards
 World Handball Team of 2011–2020 Decade's best left winger
 All-Star Left Wing of the World Championship: 2009, 2019
 All-Star Left Wing of the European Championship: 2016, 2020
 All-Star Left Wing of the EHF Champions League: 2016/2017
 Handball-Planet.com All-Star Left Wing of the Year: 2017, 2019, 2020, 2021
 All-Star Left Wing of REMA 1000-ligaen: 2019/2020, 2020/2021 2021/2022
 Team of the Tournament Left Wing of the Baia Mare Champions Trophy: 2014

Personal life
Since July 2013, she is married to Norwegian handballer, Steffen Stegavik. On 22 December 2017, Herrem announced that she is pregnant, and that the couple are expecting their first child in July 2018. On 7 July 2018, Herrem gave birth to a son called Theo. On 5 March  2023, Herrem gave birth to a son called Noah.

Camilla uten filter titled autobiographic book published in 2020.

References

External links
 
 
 Camilla Herrem at the Norwegian Handball Federation 
 
 

Living people
1986 births
People from Sola, Norway
Norwegian female handball players
Olympic medalists in handball
Olympic gold medalists for Norway
Olympic bronze medalists for Norway
Olympic handball players of Norway
Handball players at the 2012 Summer Olympics
Handball players at the 2016 Summer Olympics
Handball players at the 2020 Summer Olympics
Medalists at the 2012 Summer Olympics
Medalists at the 2016 Summer Olympics
Medalists at the 2020 Summer Olympics
Expatriate handball players
Norwegian expatriate sportspeople in Denmark
Norwegian expatriate sportspeople in Romania
Norwegian expatriate sportspeople in North Macedonia
CS Minaur Baia Mare (women's handball) players
TTH Holstebro players
Sportspeople from Rogaland
21st-century Norwegian women